Kjell Egil Eimhjellen (born 20 October 1928) is a Norwegian microbiologist.

He took the siv.ing. degree at the Norwegian Institute of Technology in 1953, and studied at Stanford University from 1957 to 1959. From 1960 to 1996 he worked at the Norwegian Institute of Technology, except for stays at the Woods Hole Oceanographic Institution from 1969 to 1970 and 1980 to 1981. He started as a lecturer, but was promoted to professor. He was dean of the Department of Chemistry from 1975 to 1977, and deputy rector of the university from 1984 to 1990, under rector Dag Kavlie.

Eimhjellen was a member of the Norwegian Academy of Science and Letters, the Royal Norwegian Society of Sciences and Letters and the Norwegian Academy of Technological Sciences.

He resides in Ranheim.

References

1928 births
Living people
Norwegian microbiologists
Norwegian Institute of Technology alumni
Academic staff of the Norwegian Institute of Technology
Norwegian expatriates in the United States
Members of the Norwegian Academy of Science and Letters
Royal Norwegian Society of Sciences and Letters
Members of the Norwegian Academy of Technological Sciences